The Thomson Medal is a medal awarded annually since 1984 by the Royal Society of New Zealand for 'organisation, support and application of science and/or technology and/or the humanities in New Zealand.'

Past winners 
Past winners were:

 1985 Alan Mackney
 1986 Colin Maiden
 1987 Ian Baumgart
 1988 Jim Hodge
 1989 Angus Tait
 1992 Mike Collins
 1994 Don Llewellyn
 1996 Richard Sadleir
 1998 Jim Johnston
 2000 Robert Anderson
 2004 John Ayers
 2006 John Hay
 2007 John Alexander Kernohan
 2008 Andy West
 2009 Richard Garland
 2010 Shaun Coffey
 2011 Neville Jordan
 2012 Richard Furneaux
 2013 Peter Lee
 2014 Rob Murdoch
 2015 Richard Blaikie
 2016 Bruce Campbell
 2017 Charles Eason
 2018 Carolyn Burns
 2019 Timothy Haskell
 2020 John Caradus
 2021 Gary Wilson
 2022 David Hutchinson

Notes

References

Science and technology in New Zealand
New Zealand awards